In enzymology, a nicotine dehydrogenase is an enzyme that catalyzes the chemical reaction

(S)-nicotine + acceptor + H2O  (S)-6-hydroxynicotine + reduced acceptor

The 3 substrates of this enzyme are (S)-nicotine, acceptor, and H2O, whereas its two products are (S)-6-hydroxynicotine and reduced acceptor.

This enzyme belongs to the family of oxidoreductases, specifically those acting on the CH-NH group of donors with other acceptors.  The systematic name of this enzyme class is nicotine:acceptor 6-oxidoreductase (hydroxylating). Other names in common use include nicotine oxidase, D-nicotine oxidase, nicotine:(acceptor) 6-oxidoreductase (hydroxylating), and L-nicotine oxidase.  It has 2 cofactors: metal,  and FMN.

References

 
 
 
 

EC 1.5.99
Metal enzymes
Flavoproteins
Enzymes of unknown structure